Woody Point is a town located in the heart of Gros Morne National Park, on the western coast of Newfoundland. Situated on Bonne Bay, the Town of Woody Point encompasses three areas: Curzon Village, Woody Point and Winterhouse Brook. It has a total population of 244 residents. Woody Point is a Registered Heritage District and has a waterfront with many heritage buildings and four Registered Newfoundland and Labrador Heritage Structures. The community is served by Route 431.

History

French Shore
Europeans were slow to settle the west coast of Newfoundland. The British were concentrated on the east coast, and the French were on the Grand Banks. The 1713 Treaty of Utrecht gave the French some area on the west coast which was extended in 1783 to the entire coast.

British settlement was spreading, as well. In 1800 the first British settlement in the Bonne Bay area occurred in Woody Point with the establishment of the firm of Joseph Bird from Sturminster Newton. He had an agent and premises to serve the British fishing interests which were principally migratory at this point. When fishermen began to stay during the winter rather than return to England, the pattern for permanent settlement was laid.

By 1904, the French had left the area to pursue fisheries farther up the coast. By this time, Woody Point was bustling. It was considered the capital of the area with banking and customs offices, merchants, and a harbour full of domestic and foreign vessels.

First settlers
John Roberts and his wife, Emma, together with their four children are considered to be the first settlers of Woody Point. They came in 1849. By 1872, there were 129 families residing in the Bonne Bay area.

In 1873, the Bonne Bay Post Office was established in the home of J.R. Roberts, John Roberts' nephew. This house was one of the first built in the area and is still standing today. It is a blue clapboarded structure on the Shore Road left of the downtown. Plans are being made to restore this house.

Solomon Wilton was the second settler to Woody Point. It was Wilton who donated the land on which the present day Church of the Epiphany was built. A school and parsonage once stood on this spot.
These early founding families are laid to rest in the Anglican cemetery on Shore Road.

Major events
In 1922, when Woody Point was experiencing the height of its population and commercial success, a devastating fire ripped through the downtown. The wind quickly carried the flames which shot all the way across the Bay to Norris Point. In all, 58 buildings were destroyed. The degree of commerce in the town never returned to the pre-fire level.

Most of the buildings currently on the waterfront date from after 1922, but there are some
exceptions. The lighthouse was built in 1919. Also, the large grey and green house to the right of the Seaside Deli was built in the 1890s. This house was the scene of a riot in 1938.

Gallery

Geography and Climate
Woody Point is underlain by a bedrock of mélange, with metagabbro and related rock on higher areas. Soils of the community and its surrounding region have been placed in the Serpentine Cove association.
Woody Point has a humid continental climate (Köppen Dfb) with extremely high winter snowfall and a strong winter seasonal lag, causing February to be the clearly coldest month. Summers are moderated by its seaside position, whereas precipitation remains high year round and rainfall is occurring during milder spells during winters. Woody Point is the snowiest year round inhabited place in Canada.

Demographics 

Arts and culture 
Woody Point is home to the Writers at Woody Point festival and Gros Morne Summer Music.

See also
List of lighthouses in Canada

References

External links

Woody Point Web Page
Writers at Woody Point
Woody Point – Encyclopedia of Newfoundland and Labrador, vol.5, p. 622-623.
 Aids to Navigation Canadian Coast Guard

Towns in Newfoundland and Labrador
Lighthouses in Newfoundland and Labrador